Yerköy YHT railway station, short for Yerköy Yüksek Hızlı Tren station, is a railway station located north of Yerköy, Turkey, that is under construction. The station is located just north of the D.200 highway near the village of Akpınar, and will service high-speed trains along the Ankara-Sivas high-speed railway.

Yerköy YHT station will become the second railway station in Yerköy, together with Yerköy station, which is serviced by conventional trains. The YHT stands for HSR or High-speed railway.

External links
Ankara-Sivas high-speed railway project 

Railway stations in Yozgat Province
Buildings and structures in Yozgat Province
High-speed railway stations in Turkey
Railway stations under construction in Turkey
Transport in Yozgat Province